Aristotelia naxia is a moth of the family Gelechiidae. It was described by Edward Meyrick in 1926. It is found on the Galápagos Islands.

The length of the forewings is 4.3-5.5 mm. The forewings are grey with dark brown markings. Adults are on wing most of the year, except June and August.

References

Moths described in 1926
Aristotelia (moth)
Moths of South America